Karma is a town and a rural commune in southwestern Niger. It is near the city of Niamey. Apart from Karma itself, the commune counts various other villages and hamlets, such as Boubon, a village known for its lively weekly market on Wednesdays and the colourful pottery produced there.

Communes of Tillabéri Region